Schizopygopsis thermalis is a species of ray-finned fish endemic to China. It occurs in the upper Salween River drainage in Tibet. Little is known about its ecology, apart from it being recorded from rivers.

Schizopygopsis thermalis grows to  SL.

References

Schizopygopsis
Freshwater fish of China
Endemic fauna of Tibet
Taxa named by Solomon Herzenstein
Fish described in 1891